Waqt Ki Awaz is a 1988 Indian action drama film directed by K. Bapayya. The film stars Mithun Chakraborty and Sridevi. Moushumi Chatterjee, Kader Khan, Shakti Kapoor, Ranjeet, Gulshan Grover and Asrani are featured in supporting roles.
Upon release, the film was a major commercial success, becoming the fifth highest-grossing film of 1988. The film was a remake of Telugu film Khaidi Rudraiah.

Plot
Wealthy Lata refuses to obey her widower father's instructions to marry equally wealthy Rajan, Rajan is the second son of Sikanker Lal Thakkar, her dad's business partner. She runs away from home, and shortly thereafter, her father locates her living with a truck-driver, Vishwa Pratap, and his pretty sister, Lakshmi. She refuses to return home. She tells her father that she would marry Vishma instead of Rajan. She soon regrets her decision when she finds out that Vishwa has been arrested for killing a male named Billa, and may have to spend his entire life behind bars or be hanged.

Cast
Mithun Chakraborty as Vishwa Pratap 
Sridevi as Lata
Moushumi Chatterjee as Justice Sharda 
Ranjeet as Shera
Kader Khan as Sikandar Lal Thakkar
Shreeram Lagoo as Ishwar Prasad
Gulshan Grover as Rajan Thakkar
Shakti Kapoor as Makhan Thakkar
Prema Narayan as Makhan's Wife
Aruna Irani as Chanda
Yunus Parvez as Public Prosecutor 
Asrani as Chirag
Vikas Anand as Jailor
Jack Gaud as Goon of Sikander
Neelam as Dancer / Singer
Ram Mohan as Ram Avatar

Soundtrack
The film's songs were popular, especially the song "Pyar Chahiye Kitni Baar", sung by Alisha Chinoy. The soundtrack contains the last recorded song by Kishore Kumar. It is a duet with Asha Bhosle and was recorded a day before his death. The song is titled "Guru Guru, Aa Jao Guru".

Box office
The film was a super hit and fifth-highest-grossing movie of 1988.

References

External links
 

1988 films
1980s Hindi-language films
Films directed by K. Bapayya
Films scored by Bappi Lahiri
Hindi remakes of Telugu films
Indian action drama films
Indian films about revenge